The "world's funniest joke" is a term used by Richard Wiseman of the University of Hertfordshire in 2002 to summarize one of the results of his research. For his experiment, named LaughLab, he created a website where people could rate and submit jokes. Purposes of the research included discovering the joke that had the widest appeal and understanding among different cultures, demographics and countries.

The History Channel eventually hosted a special on the subject.

The jokes
The winning joke, which was later found to be based on a 1951 Goon Show sketch by Spike Milligan, was submitted by Gurpal Gosal of Manchester:

Other findings
Researchers also included five computer-generated jokes, four of which fared rather poorly, but one was rated higher than one third of the human jokes:

The joke that was submitted to LaughLab the most times was:

References

Further reading

External links
 LaughLab official site

Jokes
Joke
Humor research